Paranchodemus is a genus of ground beetles in the family Carabidae. There are at least four described species in Paranchodemus, found in eastern Asia.

Species
These four species belong to the genus Paranchodemus:
 Paranchodemus calleides (Bates, 1883)  (Japan)
 Paranchodemus davidis Liebherr, 1989  (China)
 Paranchodemus ishiguroi Morita; Toda & Kanie, 2008  (Japan)
 Paranchodemus thibetanus (Morvan, 1998)  (China)

References

Platyninae